John Talbot Stonor (1678–1756) was an English Roman Catholic bishop who served as the Vicar Apostolic of the Midland District from 1715 to 1756. 

Born in 1678, he was appointed the Vicar Apostolic of the Midland District and Titular Bishop of Thespiae by the Holy See on 18 September 1715. He was consecrated to the Episcopate on 9 August 1716, the principal consecrator was Cardinal Henri-Pons de Thiard de Bissy, Bishop of Meaux, France. Bishop Stonor did much to persuade Catholics to accept the Hanoverian monarchy, which resulted in greater tolerance towards Catholics. 

He died in office on 29 March 1756, aged 78.

References 
 

1678 births
1756 deaths
18th-century Roman Catholic bishops in England
Apostolic vicars of England and Wales